Amara deparca is a species of beetle of the genus Amara in the family Carabidae.

References

deparca
Beetles described in 1830
Taxa named by Thomas Say